I.E.S Abdera is a secondary school in Adra, Spain. It caters for students aged 11–18 and is part of the Bilingual programme (English)

External links

Secondary schools in Spain